The cabinet of Ola Ullsten was the cabinet and Government of Sweden from 18 October 1978 to 12 October 1979.

The cabinet was a single-party minority government consisting the Liberal People's Party. The cabinet was led by Prime Minister Ola Ullsten who was asked to form a minority government by the Speaker of the Riksdag after several failed attempts to form an active/inactive majority cabinet. The cabinet was the first cabinet consisting only of the Liberal People's Party since 1932 and is also the only since then.

The cabinet resigned on 12 October 1979 following the 1979 general election to make way for a coalition majority government led by Thorbjörn Fälldin. The cabinet was succeeded by Thorbjörn Fälldin's Second Cabinet.

Policy 
The Swedish nuclear energy program had been enacted by the Riksdag in 1975 which entailed an expansion to 13 nuclear power plants in total by 1985. The Riksdag had also decided that energy policy was to be re-evaluated in 3 years and that the safety of nuclear power was to be investigated. The previous Fälldin Cabinet had instated a committee with the task of evaluating nuclear safety. Minister for Energy Carl Tham was working on drafting a government bill regarding energy policy, with Social Democrats Ingvar Carlsson and Birgitta Dahl following his work closely. Both the Social Democratic and Moderate parties held positive views regarding nuclear power and it was assumed that the government wouldn't have any difficulties passing the bill.

However, following the Three Mile Island accident, everything changed. While Olof Palme, the Social Democratic leader, had criticized the Fälldin cabinet for unnecessarily delaying the expansion of nuclear power in the past, Palme and his party did a complete turn-around on the issue, demanding a popular referendum to decide the future of nuclear power on 4 April 1979. During the remainder of the spring, the parties discussed how a popular referendum was to be performed and what choices voters would have. Eventually, it was decided that voters would be able to pick three choices, all of which revolved around abolishing nuclear power at various rates.

Ingemar Mundebo, the Minister for the Economy and the Budget, was working on a proposal to lower the marginal tax rate and enacting an upper limit to the tax. The government expected the proposition to pass with the support of the Centre Party and Moderates. In the spring of 1979, however, the Centre Party voted against the proposal, since they found inconsistencies in financing the proposal. The bill, thus, did not pass.

In December 1978 it was revealed that while Sweden was supporting the East Timor independence movement, the government was simultaneously allowing the export of arms to the occupying Indonesian forces. The Minister of Commerce and Industry Hadar Cars stated that this was completely allowed.

The government also managed to pass several reforms, such as increased parental insurance, corporate tax reforms and a new education plan (Lgr80). Child corporal punishment was legally abolished during the reign of the Ullsten cabinet.

Ministers 

|}

References

External links
The Government and the Government Offices of Sweden

1978 establishments in Sweden
Ullsten, Ola
Politics of Sweden
1979 disestablishments in Sweden
Cabinets established in 1978
Cabinets disestablished in 1979